The 1991 Danish Superliga season was the 1st season of the Danish Superliga league championship, governed by the Danish Football Association.

After about 33 years it had been decided to abandon the format where the league would follow the calendar year, therefore the first superliga season was a short dash through the spring of 1991. The following season would kick off in August and end in May.

There was no continental qualification as it had been decided the previous year, with Brøndby IF qualifying for the 1991–92 European Cup, and B 1903 qualifying for the 1991–92 UEFA Cup along with Ikast fS. Odense, however, qualified for the 1991–92 European Cup Winners' Cup through the 1991–92 Danish Cup.

The lowest placed team of the tournament was directly relegated to the Danish 1st Division. Likewise, the Danish 1st Division champions were promoted to the Superliga. The second lowest team in the Superliga and the 1st Division runners-up played a promotion game, for competing in the Superliga.

Table

Relegation play-off

Silkeborg IF overcame a home first leg defeat to remain in the Superliga.

Results

Top goalscorers
Bent Christensen was the top goalscorer, scoring 11 in 18 appearances.

References

External links
  Peders Fodboldstatistik

Danish Superliga seasons
1
1
Danish
Danish